Taloja Panchanad (formerly Taloja) is a railway station in Taloja Panchnand in Raigad district on the Vasai Road–Diva–Panvel–Roha route of the Central Line, of the Mumbai Suburban Railway network.

Taloja Panchanand railway station and Vasai Road–Diva–Panvel route is included in suburban section. Also this section is under the consideration in MUTP 3.

Taloja Panchanand has regular trains for Panvel, Diva and Vasai. Express trains does not halt at this station, only Passenger train halts. Upcoming Taloja Panchanad metro station will be connected to this railway station. This station is also used for goods train (cement) unloading.

References

Railway stations in Raigad district
Mumbai Suburban Railway stations
Mumbai CR railway division
Diva-Panvel rail line